Colletotrichum crassipes is a plant pathogen.

References

External links

crassipes
Fungal plant pathogens and diseases
Fungi described in 1957